Fear Itself is a BBC Books original novel written by Nick Wallace and based on the long-running British science fiction television series Doctor Who. It features the Eighth Doctor, Fitz and Anji.

Synopsis
It is the twenty-second century and Earth is caught in a war with powerful alien forces. Paranoia runs rampant and the Doctor is in danger from all directions.

This was the only Past Doctor Adventure to feature the Eighth Doctor, as the original novels featuring that incarnation formed their own series, the Eighth Doctor Adventures. However, with the 2005 revival of the television series, and the BBC's New Series Adventures being published, the Eighth Doctor Adventures came to an end.  By the time Fear Itself was released, Christopher Eccleston and David Tennant had made their debuts as the Ninth and Tenth incarnations of the Doctor, thus making the Eighth a "Past Doctor".

External links
The Whoniverse's review on Fear Itself

2005 British novels
2005 science fiction novels
Past Doctor Adventures
Eighth Doctor novels